Fürstenfeldbruck is a town in Bavaria, Germany, located 32 kilometres west of Munich. It is the capital of the district of Fürstenfeldbruck.  it has a population of 35,494. Since the 1930s, Fürstenfeldbruck has had an air force base.

The name of Fürstenfeldbruck  is composed of two parts, namely 'Bruck', Bavarian dialect for 'bridge' (meaning the bridge over the Amper river) and after the famous monastery of Fürstenfeld Abbey.

Geography
Fürstenfeldbruck covers an area of 32.53 km². It is located halfway between Munich and Augsburg, and along the Amper river.

Main sights
Cistercian monastery (Fürstenfeld Abbey), founded in 1266 by Louis II, Duke of Bavaria and closed in 1803. It was one of the favourite monasteries of the Wittelsbach family.
Parish church of St. Magdalene (late 17th century)
Pilgrim church of St. Leonhard. A Gothic building which can be crossed riding a horse.
Aumühle, a 14th-century mill now housing the municipal library.

Fürstenfeldbruck Air Base

Fürstenfeldbruck has been the site of an Air Base since 1936.   It was used by the Luftwaffe before and during World War II.   It was used by United States Air Force after World War II and returned to the German government in 1957 and used as a base for the modern German Air Force ever since.

The air force base was the site of the Munich Massacre during the 1972 Summer Olympics.  The nine Israeli hostages (two had been killed earlier at the Olympic Village) and eight Black September terrorists who captured them were flown to the base from the Olympic Village via helicopter, where the terrorists demanded they, and their hostages, be flown to a friendly Arab nation. After a botched rescue attempt by Bavarian border guards and Munich police, the terrorists killed all of the nine remaining Israeli hostages, who were unable to escape from the helicopters. Five of the terrorists and a Munich policeman were also killed in the gunfight.

Economy
The American company Texas Instruments has offices in Fürstenfeldbruck, and Coca-Cola European Partners has a bottling facility there as well. Also, it is the home of Leuze lumiflex, the maker of safety products (light curtains).

Twin towns – sister cities

Fürstenfeldbruck is twinned with:
 Almuñécar, Spain
 Cerveteri, Italy
 Livry-Gargan, France
 Wichita Falls, United States
 Zadar, Croatia

Notable people
  (1869–1934), German sculptor and goldsmith
 Olaf Ittenbach (born 1969), German horror film director
 Anna Katharina Kränzlein (born 1980), violinist, founding member of the folk rock band Schandmaul
 Corinna Lechner (born 1994), cyclist
 Ernst Mayr (computer scientist) (born 1950), computer scientist, professor of the TU Munich, winner of the Gottfried Wilhelm Leibniz Prize 1997
 Ferdinand von Miller (1813–1887), iron moulder, builder of Bavaria

Persons with reference to Fürstenfeldbruck 

 Johannes Mathesius (1504–1565), Luther biographer and reformer: In Bruck, he studied the teaching and traveling years of Luther's teachings in the house of the pastor Zacharias Weichsner
 Adolf Des Coudres (1862–1924), landscape painter, died in Fürstenfeldbruck
 Richard W. Higgins (1922–1957), pilot of the USAF sacrificed his life in 1957 to prevent a plane crash over Fürstenfeldbruck
 Alexander Wesselsky (born 1968), singer and musician of the band Eisbrecher, lives mostly in Fürstenfeldbruck and attended the Viscardi-Gymnasium

References

Fürstenfeldbruck (district)